The Veterans Committee is the popular name of various committees of the National Baseball Hall of Fame and Museum that elect participants other than recently retired players.

Originally, it referenced the National Baseball Hall of Fame Committee to Consider Managers, Umpires, Executives and Long-Retired Players; a former voting committee of the Baseball Hall of Fame that provided an opportunity for Hall of Fame enshrinement to all individuals who are eligible for induction but ineligible for consideration by the Baseball Writers' Association of America (BBWAA). The term "Veterans Committee" is taken from the body's former official name: National Baseball Hall of Fame Committee on Baseball Veterans, which first met in 1953.

The committee structure and voting process has undergone multiple changes, most recently in April 2022. Currently, baseball players and non-players (managers, executives, and umpires) considered by the committee are classed into two timeframes, the Contemporary Baseball Era (1980–present) and the Classic Baseball Era (before 1980). Voting is conducted annually in December, with any elected persons inducted into the Hall of Fame the following calendar year. Balloting currently rotates on an annual basis for nominees selected from one of three groups: players of the Contemporary Baseball Era, non-players of the Contemporary Baseball Era, and all persons of the Classic Baseball Era.

History

The Veterans Committee can be traced back to 1939 when Commissioner of Baseball Kenesaw Mountain Landis formed the Old-Timers Committee to consider players from the 19th century for induction to the Hall of Fame. In 1939, the committee selected five players. In 1944, shortly after Landis' death, the committee voted him into the Hall via a special election. Landis was the 28th person inducted to the Hall—over the next several years, the committee added 23 more: 10 in 1945, 11 in 1946, and 2 in 1949.
 
In 1953, the Veterans Committee met for the first time under the name Committee on Baseball Veterans. In its first voting, the 11-member committee elected six players to the Hall. Starting in 1955, they would meet to elect up to two players in odd-numbered years. In 1959, Lee Allen succeeded Ernest Lanigan as Hall of Fame historian. According to Bill James, Paul Kerr (president of the Hall of Fame from 1961 to 1978) would generally convince the committee to select players that Allen suggested to him, until Allen's death in 1969. In 1961, the Veterans Committee expanded from 11 to 12 members. In 1962, the Veterans Committee went back to annual elections to the Hall of Fame, with the continued mandate to elect up to two players a year. In 1971, the Veterans Committee made seven selections; partly in response to such a large class, the Veterans Committee was then limited to selecting two players and one non-player every year.

Frankie Frisch, a 1947 inductee to the Hall, was a major voice on the committee in the 1970s. Backed by former teammate and fellow Hall of Famer Bill Terry and sportswriters J. Roy Stockton and Fred Lieb, who had covered Frisch's teams, he managed to get five of his teammates elected to the Hall by the committee between 1970 and 1973: Jesse Haines, Dave Bancroft, Chick Hafey, Ross Youngs, and George Kelly. Additionally, in the three years after his death, two more teammates (Jim Bottomley and Freddie Lindstrom) were elected. After Frisch died and Terry left the committee, elections were normalized.

After the 1977 election, the Veterans Committee was limited to two selections overall per year. In 1978, membership increased to 15 members; five Hall of Famers, five owners and executives, and five sportswriters. The members would meet in Florida during spring training to elect a player or two every year. The Veterans Committee mandate of up to two players was increased briefly from 1995 to 2001. In these years, the committee could elect one extra player from the Negro leagues and one from the 19th century in addition to the two regular players.

Starting in 1995, the Veterans Committee met in closed sessions to elect as many as two executives, managers, umpires, and older major league players—the categories considered in all its meetings since 1953. By a new arrangement it separately considered candidates from the Negro leagues and from the 19th century with authority to select one from each of those, via two special ballots. The older players eligible were those with ten major league seasons beginning 1946 or earlier; those who received at least 100 votes from the BBWAA in some election up to 1992; and those who received at least 60% support in some election beginning 1993. Players on Major League Baseball's ineligible list cannot be elected. The committee can elect up to four people each year.

During much of its existence, the Veterans Committee consisted of 15 members selected by the Hall of Fame for defined terms. A six-man subcommittee of this group met as a screening committee to determine who would be on the ballot. The committee met annually to consider candidates in four separate categories: players, managers, umpires, and executives. The Veterans Committee met privately, and its ballots and voting results were generally not revealed prior to 2003. From the mid-1970s until 2001, the top candidate in each category was elected to the Hall of Fame if he earned at least 75% of the committee's votes.

The Board of Directors reformed the system radically with new rules enacted in August 2001. Formerly, 15 members were appointed to limited terms; the new Veterans Committee would comprise all living members of the Hall, plus recipients of the Spink and Frick awards to writers and broadcasters. In particular, the new members were 61 living Hall of Famers, 13 living recipients of the J. G. Taylor Spink Award, 13 living recipients of the Ford C. Frick Award, and three members of the previous committee with terms that had not yet expired. Elections for players retired more than 20 years would be held every other year and elections for (managers, umpires and executives) would be held every fourth year. The first cycle for both categories would be in 2002 and 2003 for induction in 2003.

Revisions to the voting process

2001 revisions

In 2001, the Hall of Fame radically changed the composition and election procedures for the Veterans Committee, which was revised to consist of:

All living members of the Hall of Fame;
All living recipients of the Ford C. Frick Award for baseball broadcasters;
And all living recipients of the J. G. Taylor Spink Award for baseball writers.

All members of the former Veterans Committee remained active until the expiration of their terms. Only two were on the committee for the 2003 election, the first under the new election procedures. Only one of the former Veterans Committee members (John McHale) remained on the committee for the 2005 and 2007 elections, and his term expired immediately after the 2007 election.

The election procedures instituted in 2003 are listed below. The procedures were changed again in 2007. Rules, and portions thereof, that changed in 2007 are indicated in italics.
Elections for players would now be held every two years, starting in 2003.
Managers, umpires, and executives would be elected from a single composite ballot every four years, starting in 2003.
The Historical Overview Committee, a ten-member panel appointed by the secretary-treasurer of the Baseball Writers' Association of America, created an initial list of figures from whom both ballots would be created. At this point, the players' ballot consisted of 200 players.
Ballots were screened by two groups – a sixty-member panel drawn from the membership of the BBWAA, and a panel of six living Hall of Famers selected by the Hall of Fame Board. The Hall of Famer panel selected five players for the players' ballot, and the BBWAA panel selected twenty-five players for the players' ballot, as well as all candidates for the composite ballot.
The selections of the Hall of Famer and BBWAA panels were then merged, creating a single players' ballot. Players chosen on both ballots appeared only once on this ballot, which now contained a minimum of twenty-five and a maximum of thirty players.
The players' ballot and composite ballot (fifteen candidates) are made public before voting.
Balloting is held by mail, with a stated deadline.
The Veterans Committee vote is made public after voting.
All candidates who receive 75% or more of the vote are elected; election is no longer restricted to only the top vote-getter.
Every player with ten or more years of major-league experience who has not been active in the previous twenty years, and is not on Major League Baseball's ineligible list, is eligible for Veterans Committee consideration. In the past, players who did not receive a certain percentage of the votes on a BBWAA ballot were permanently ineligible for Hall of Fame consideration.

Using these procedures, no one was elected to the Hall of Fame by the Veterans Committee in 2003, 2005, or 2007.

2007 revisions
Following the 2007 elections, the makeup of the committee was again changed, and several procedures were also modified:

Changes affecting all elections
The Historical Overview Committee will continue to formulate the players and managers/umpires ballots, but it will now present a players' ballot of only twenty players and a managers/umpires ballot of only ten figures. The executives ballot, consisting of ten individuals, will be formulated by the voting body for that ballot.

Changes affecting player elections
The players ballot is now restricted to players whose careers began in 1943 or later.
Voting for the players ballot is now restricted to Hall of Fame members. Winners of the Frick and Spink Awards are considered "honorees" and are thus ineligible to vote on the main players ballot.
The list of those eligible for the players ballot will be separately reviewed by a six-member panel of Hall of Famers, which will select five players for the ballot.
Next, all living Hall of Famers are invited to a meeting at the Hall of Fame during induction weekend. The Hall of Famers who are present at this meeting will narrow the list to a final ballot of 10 players.
The final players ballot is sent to all living Hall of Famers, who can vote for as many as four individuals.

Pre-World War II players
Players whose careers began before 1943 are now considered every five years by a committee of twelve Hall of Famers, writers, and baseball historians, to be chosen by the Hall of Fame Board. The first election of pre-World War II players was conducted in 2009.

Changes affecting non-player elections
The composite ballot will be split into two separate ballots, one for managers and umpires and the other for executives.
Voting on the managers/umpires and executives ballots will now be conducted for induction in even-numbered years, starting with the class of 2008.
The voting body for the managers/umpires ballot will be a sixteen-member body of Hall of Famers, executives, and media veterans appointed by the Hall of Fame Board.
The voting body for the executives ballot will be a separate twelve-member body of Hall of Famers, executives, and media veterans appointed by the Hall of Fame Board.
Each ballot is presented to the applicable voting board. As is the case for the players' ballot, each voter can choose as many as four individuals.

The threshold for induction remained at 75% of all who voted on the appropriate ballot. In the first election held under the new rules, two managers and three executives were elected in December 2007 as part of the 2008 election process.

2010 revisions
The Hall announced a new Veterans Committee voting process on June 26, 2010, effective with the 2011 election process that began late in 2010. The two biggest changes are:
 Managers, umpires, executives, and players will now be considered on a single ballot.
 Living Hall of Fame members will no longer constitute a single electoral body. Instead, separate 16-member subcommittees will be created to vote on individuals from different eras of baseball.

Candidates were classified by the time-periods that cover their greatest contributions:
 Pre-Integration Era (1871–1946)
 Golden Era (1947–1972)
 Expansion Era (1973 and later)

Candidates from each era were considered every third year, starting with the Expansion Era in the 2011 election (December 2010, 2013), followed by the Golden Era (December 2011, 2014) and then by the Pre-Integration Era (December 2012, 2015).

The existing Historical Overview Committee formulated each ballot for release in the October or November before the next planned induction ceremony. The Expansion Era ballot included 12 candidates, while the other two ballots included ten each. The Hall's Board of Directors selected 16-member committees for each era, made up of Hall of Famers, executives, baseball historians, and media members. Each committee convened at the Winter Meetings in December to consider and vote on candidates from its assigned era. As before, the threshold of induction remained at 75% of those voting.

2016 revisions
On July 23, 2016, the Hall of Fame announced changes to the Era Committee system. Highlighting these changes was a restructuring of the time-frames to be considered, with a much greater emphasis on modern eras. Additionally, those major league players, managers, umpires and executives who excelled before 1950, as well Negro leagues stars, would still be afforded an opportunity to have their careers reviewed, but with less frequency.

Separate 16-member subcommittees were defined to vote on individuals from different eras of baseball, with candidates still being classified by the time-periods that covered their greatest contributions:
 Early Baseball (1871–1949)
 Golden Days (1950–1969)
 Modern Baseball (1970–1987)
 Today's Game (1988–present)

The size of all committee ballots was set at 10 candidates. Whilst there was previously a one-year waiting period after elimination from annual BBWAA consideration, that waiting period was removed. The Today's Game and Modern Baseball committees were scheduled to convene twice every five years, the Golden Days committee once every five years, and the Early Baseball committee once every 10 years.

While meetings take place in December, voting was included with the induction class for the following calendar year (e.g. December 2016 committee balloting was part of 2017 Hall of Fame elections and induction).

The induction ceremony originally scheduled for July 26, 2020, was cancelled due to the COVID-19 pandemic; persons originally scheduled for induction in 2020 were inducted in 2021. Committee meetings originally scheduled for December 2020 (Golden Days and Early Baseball) were postponed for a year, due to the COVID-19 pandemic. Committee scheduling for 2022 and beyond is not presented here, as the structure of committees was further amended in April 2022.

The criteria for committee eligibility differed for players, managers, and executives:
 Players: Must be retired for at least 15 years. This means that no player will be eligible for committee consideration until a minimum of 10 years after he first becomes eligible to appear on the BBWAA ballot, regardless of whether or not he appears on a ballot.
 The Hall has not yet established a policy on the timing of eligibility for committee consideration for players who die while active or during the standard 5-year waiting period for BBWAA eligibility. In these instances, the standard waiting period for BBWAA eligibility of 5 years from retirement is shortened to 6 months from death.
 Managers and umpires: Must have at least 10 years of service in that role, and either be (1) retired for at least 5 years or (2) at least age 65 and retired for 6 months.
 Executives: Must be retired for at least 5 years, or be at least age 70. Executives who meet the age cutoff will be considered regardless of their positions in an organization or their currently active statuses. Previously, active executives 65 years or older were eligible for consideration.

2022 revisions
The Hall of Fame announced additional changes to its era committees on April 22, 2022, effective immediately. The multiple eras previously utilized were collapsed into just two eras: the Contemporary Baseball Era (1980–present) and the Classic Baseball Era (prior to 1980). An annual rotation of three ballots was also defined:
 Contemporary Baseball Era players: balloting in December 2022 for the class of 2023
 Contemporary Baseball Era non-players (managers, executives, and umpires): balloting in December 2023 for the class of 2024
 Classic Baseball Era: balloting in December 2024 for the class of 2025
The rotation will then continue every three years. A one-year waiting period beyond potential BBWAA eligibility (which had been abolished in 2016) was reintroduced, thus restricting the committee to considering players retired for at least 16 seasons.

Potential future candidates

Contemporary Baseball Era Player Ballot (1980–present) 
Players: Dwight Evans (on 2020 ballot w/ 8 votes), Don Mattingly (on 2018, 2020 & 2022 ballots w/ 8 votes), Dave Parker (on 2014, 2018 & 2020 w/ 7 votes ballots), Curt Schilling (on 2022 ballot w/ 7 votes), Lou Whitaker (on 2020 ballot w/ 6 votes), Dale Murphy (on 2018, 2020, & 2022 ballots w/ 6 votes), Albert Belle (on 2017, 2019 & 2022 ballots), Will Clark (on 2017 & 2019 ballots), Orel Hershiser (on 2017 & 2019 ballots), Barry Bonds (on 2022 ballot), Roger Clemens (on 2022 ballot), Rafael Palmeiro (on 2022 ballot), Joe Carter (on 2019 ballot), Mark McGwire (on 2017 ballot), Dan Quisenberry (on 2014 ballot), Ron Guidry (on 2011 ballot), Rick Aguilera, Edgardo Alfonzo, Moises Alou, Brady Anderson, Kevin Appier, Buddy Bell, Jay Bell, Dante Bichette, Bobby Bonilla, Bob Boone, Kevin Brown, Ellis Burks, Brett Butler, Ken Caminiti, Jose Canseco, Jack Clark, David Cone, Darren Daulton, Chili Davis, Carlos Delgado, Brian Downing, Tony Fernández, Cecil Fielder, Chuck Finley, Steve Finley, John Franco, Julio Franco, Gary Gaetti, Eric Gagne, Andrés Galarraga, Kirk Gibson, Juan González, Luis Gonzalez, Dwight Gooden, Mark Grace, Shawn Green, Ken Griffey Sr., Marquis Grissom, Pedro Guerrero, Tom Henke, Pat Hentgen, Keith Hernandez, Roberto Hernández, Charlie Hough, Doug Jones, Brian Jordan, Wally Joyner, David Justice, Jeff Kent, Jimmy Key, Chuck Knoblauch, Mark Langston, Ray Lankford, Carney Lansford, Al Leiter, Chet Lemon, Kenny Lofton, Javy Lopez, Fred Lynn, Dennis Martinez, Willie McGee, José Mesa, Jeff Montgomery, Randy Myers, Robb Nen, Hideo Nomo, John Olerud, Paul O'Neill, Lance Parrish, Tony Peña, Terry Pendleton, Troy Percival, Tony Phillips, Brad Radke, Willie Randolph, Jeff Reardon, Rick Reuschel, Dave Righetti, José Rijo, Bret Saberhagen, Tim Salmon, Steve Sax, Rubén Sierra, J.T. Snow, Sammy Sosa, Dave Stewart, Dave Stieb, Darryl Strawberry, Jim Sundberg, B. J. Surhoff, Rick Sutcliffe, Frank Tanana, Kent Tekulve, Garry Templeton, Fernando Valenzuela, Greg Vaughn, Mo Vaughn, Robin Ventura, Frank Viola, Tim Wallach, Bob Welch, David Wells, John Wetteland, Devon White, Frank White, Bernie Williams, Matt Williams, Willie Wilson and Todd Zeile.

Players Lance Berkman, Eric Chavez, Johnny Damon, Adam Dunn, Jim Edmonds, Nomar Garciaparra, Jason Giambi, Ryan Howard, Tim Hudson, Jason Kendall, Paul Konerko, Cliff Lee, Tim Lincecum, Justin Morneau, Joe Nathan, Magglio Ordóñez, Roy Oswalt, Jonathan Papelbon, Jorge Posada, Édgar Rentería, Johan Santana, Alfonso Soriano, Miguel Tejada, Mark Teixeira and Michael Young were ineligible for the 2023 Today's Game ballot as they had not been retired for 15 years.

Contemporary Baseball Era Non-Player Ballot (1980–present) 
Managers: Lou Piniella (2017 w/ 7 votes & 2019 ballots w/ 11 votes), Davey Johnson (on 2008, 2010, 2017 & 2019 ballots), Tom Kelly (on 2010 ballot), Charlie Manuel (on 2019 ballot), Felipe Alou, Roger Craig, Jim Fregosi, Ron Gardenhire, Cito Gaston, Mike Hargrove, Art Howe, Dick Howser, Clint Hurdle, Jim Leyland, Joe Maddon, Jack McKeon, Johnny Oates, Mike Scioscia, Bobby Valentine, Ned Yost, Don Zimmer;

General managers: John Hart;

Owners: George Steinbrenner (on 2011, 2014, 2017 & 2019 ballots), George W. Bush, Peter O'Malley, Ted Turner;

Other executives: Bill White (on 2007 w/ 24 votes & 2010 ballots), Bobby Brown;

Umpires: Larry Barnett, Joe Brinkman, Derryl Cousins, Jerry Crawford, Bob Davidson, Jim Evans, Bruce Froemming, Rich Garcia, Randy Marsh, Tim McClelland, Larry McCoy, John McSherry, Ed Montague, Steve Palermo, Dave Phillips, Mike Reilly, Tim Welke, Harry Wendelstedt;

Managers Dusty Baker and Bruce Bochy are ineligible until they retire from managing the Houston Astros and Texas Rangers, respectively, for at least 6 months. Executives Brian Cashman, Dave Dombrowski, and Andrew Friedman are ineligible until after the 2023 Today's Game ballot, as they will not have been retired for 5 years nor turned 70 until after that election. Sandy Alderson and Stan Kasten are ineligible until after the 2023 Today's Game ballot as they will not have been retired for 5 years. Dan O'Dowd is ineligible until after the 2023 Today's Game ballot as he will not have turned 70 years old by then as he was born in 1958.

Classic Baseball Era Composite Ballot (1871–1979) 
Formerly eligible for the Modern Baseball Ballot (1970–1987) 
Players: Luis Tiant (on 2007 w/ 15 votes, 2009 w/ 13 votes, 2012, 2015 & 2018 ballots), Al Oliver (on 2007 w/ 14 votes, 2009 w/ 9 votes & 2011 ballots), Mickey Lolich (on 2007 ballot w/ 8 votes), Steve Garvey (on 2011, 2014, 2018 & 2020 w/ 6 votes ballots), Thurman Munson (on 2007 w/ 6 votes & 2020 ballots), Sparky Lyle (on 2007 ballot w/ 6 votes), Bobby Bonds (on 2007 ballot w/ 1 vote), Tommy John (on 2011, 2014, 2018 & 2020 ballots), Dave Concepción (on 2014 ballot), Vida Blue (on 2011 ballot), Rusty Staub (on 2011 ballot), Dusty Baker, Sal Bando, Don Baylor, Mark Belanger, Larry Bowa, Bill Buckner, Jeff Burroughs, Bert Campaneris, César Cedeño, Ron Cey, Chris Chambliss, Cecil Cooper, José Cruz, Bucky Dent, Darrell Evans, George Foster, Oscar Gamble, Bobby Grich, Toby Harrah, John Hiller, Ken Holtzman, Burt Hooton, Willie Horton, Don Kessinger, Dave Kingman, Jerry Koosman, Davey Lopes, Greg Luzinski, Bill Madlock, Mike Marshall, Gary Matthews, Lee May, Tug McGraw, Hal McRae, Andy Messersmith, Rick Monday, Bobby Murcer, Graig Nettles, Joe Niekro, Amos Otis, Rico Petrocelli, Lou Piniella, Jerry Reuss, Mickey Rivers, Steve Rogers, Bill Russell, George Scott, Ken Singleton, Reggie Smith, Paul Splittorff, Gene Tenace, Mike Torrez, Bob Watson, & Wilbur Wood; 

Managers: Billy Martin (on 2007 w/ 12 votes, 2008, 2010, 2011 & 2014 ballots), Gene Mauch (on 2008 & 2010 ballots), Ralph Houk, John McNamara, Chuck Tanner; 

Executives: Harry Dalton (on 2007 ballot w/ 8 votes), John Fetzer (on 2008 ballot w/ 4 votes & 2010 ballot w/ 8 votes), Charlie O. Finley (on 2007 w/ 10 votes & 2012 ballots), Bob Howsam (on 2008 w/ 3 votes, 2010, & 2015 ballots), Ewing Kauffman (on 2008 w/ 5 votes & 2010 ballots w/ 6 votes), Gene Autry (on 2010 ballot), Charles Bronfman, Al Campanis, Frank Cashen, Chub Feeney, Paul Owens, Cedric Tallis; 

Umpires: Marty Springstead, Lee Weyer.

Pete Rose has been ruled ineligible for future ballots due to his gambling on baseball when he was manager of the Cincinnati Reds. He has since sought to remove his name from baseball's "Permanently Ineligible" list so he can appear on the Modern Baseball Era Committee's ballot. The only way that will happen is if the Commissioner of Baseball removes his name from the "Permanently Ineligible" list.

Formerly eligible for the Golden Days Ballot (1950–1969)
Players: Dick Allen (on 2007 w/ 9 votes, 2009 w/ 7 votes, 2015 ballot w/ 11 votes, & 2022 ballot w/ 11 votes), Ken Boyer (on 2007 w/ 9 votes, 2012 ballot, 2015 ballot, & 2022 ballot w/ less than 4 votes), Rocky Colavito (on 2007 ballot w/ 5 votes), Curt Flood (on 2007 ballot w/ 14 votes), Roger Maris (on 2007 ballot w/ 15 votes, & 2022 ballot w/ less than 4 votes), Don Newcombe (on 2007 ballot w/ 17 votes), Billy Pierce (on 2015 ballot & 2022 ballot w/ less than 4 votes), Vada Pinson (on 2007 w/ 16 votes & 2009 ballots), Mickey Vernon (on 2007 ballot w/ 14 votes), Maury Wills (on 2007 w/ 33 votes, 2009 w/ 15 votes, 2015 ballot w/ 9 votes & 2022 ballot w/ less than 4 votes), Joe Adcock, Felipe Alou, Steve Barber, Lew Burdette, Norm Cash, Del Crandall, Mike Cuellar, Alvin Dark, Tommy Davis, Willie Davis, Murry Dickson, Del Ennis, Carl Erskine, Roy Face, Bill Freehan, Jim Fregosi, Bob Friend, Carl Furillo, Mike Garcia, Ned Garver, Jim Gilliam, Dick Groat, Elston Howard, Frank Howard, Larry Jackson, Jackie Jensen, Ted Kluszewski, Harvey Kuenn, Vern Law, Sherm Lollar, Eddie Lopat, Sal Maglie, Jim Maloney, Tim McCarver, Lindy McDaniel, Gil McDougald, Sam McDowell, Denny McLain, Roy McMillan, Dave McNally, Stu Miller, Claude Osteen, Andy Pafko, Milt Pappas, Ron Perranoski, Camilo Pascual, Jim Perry, Johnny Podres, Boog Powell, Vic Raschi, Bobby Richardson, Al Rosen, Roy Sievers, Curt Simmons, Mel Stottlemyre, Tony Taylor, Bobby Thomson, Jimmy Wynn & Eddie Yost;
 

Managers: Danny Murtaugh (on 2008 w/ 6 votes & 2010 ballots w/ 8 votes, & 2022 ballot w/ less than 4 votes), Paul Richards (on 2007 ballot w/ 10 votes), Fred Hutchinson, Bill Rigney, Birdie Tebbetts;
 

General Managers: Buzzie Bavasi (on 2007 w/ 30 votes, 2008 & 2012 ballots), John McHale (on 2008 & 2010 ballots), Gabe Paul (on 2007 w/ 10 votes, 2008 & 2010 ballots), Bing Devine, Frank Lane;
 

Owners: Gussie Busch (on 2007 ballot w/ 13 votes), Phil Wrigley (on 2007 ballot w/ 9 votes), Calvin Griffith

Umpires: Augie Donatelli, Tom Gorman, Jim Honochick, Hank Soar.

Formerly eligible for the Early Baseball Ballot (1871–1949)
Negro league personnel: John Donaldson (on 2006 Negro League Ballot & 2022 Ballot with 8 votes), Vic Harris (on 2022 ballot with 10 votes), Home Run Johnson (on 2006 Pre-Negro League Ballot & 2022 ballot w/ less than 4 votes), Dick Redding (on 2006 Pre-Negro League Ballot & 2022 ballot w/ less than 4 votes), George Scales (on 2006 Negro League Ballot & 2022 ballot w/ 4 votes), Newt Allen (on 2006 Negro League Ballot), John Beckwith (on 2006 Negro League Ballot), William Bell (on 2006 Negro League Ballot), Chet Brewer (on 2006 Negro League Ballot), Bill Byrd (on 2006 Negro League Ballot), Rap Dixon (on 2006 Negro League Ballot),  Sammy T. Hughes (on 2006 Negro League Ballot), Fats Jenkins (on 2006 Negro League Ballot), Dick Lundy (on 2006 Negro League Ballot), Oliver Marcell (on 2006 Negro League Ballot), Dobie Moore (on 2006 Negro League Ballot), Alejandro Oms (on 2006 Negro League Ballot), Red Parnell (on 2006 Negro League Ballot), Candy Jim Taylor (on 2006 Negro League Ballot), C.I. Taylor (on 2006 Negro League Ballot), Spot Poles (on 2006 Pre-Negro League Ballot), Bingo DeMoss, Bruce Petway, Ted Radcliffe;
 
Major league players: Bill Dahlen (on 2009, 2013 w/ 10 votes & 2016 ballots w/ 8 votes & 2022 ballot w/ less than 4 votes), Wes Ferrell (on 2007 w/ 7 votes, 2009 w/ 6 votes, 2013 & 2016 ballots), Sherry Magee (on 2009 ballot w/ 3 votes), Marty Marion (on 2007 w/ 11 votes, 2013 & 2016 ballots), Carl Mays (on 2007 w/ 6 votes & 2009 ballots), Lefty O'Doul (on 2007 ballot w/ 15 votes & 2022 ballot w/ 5 votes), Allie Reynolds (on 2009 w/ 8 votes, 2012, & 2022 ballots w/ 6 votes), Harry Stovey (on 2016 ballot w/ 8 votes), Cecil Travis (on 2007 ballot w/ 12 votes), Mickey Vernon (on 2009 ballot w/ 5 votes), Bucky Walters (on 2009 w/ 4 votes, 2013 & 2016 ballots), Frank McCormick (on 2016 ballot), Tony Mullane (on 2013 ballot), Vern Stephens (on 2009 ballot), Babe Adams, Ross Barnes, Dick Bartell, Ginger Beaumont, Charlie Bennett, Wally Berger, Tommy Bond, Bill Bradley, Harry Brecheen, Ted Breitenstein, Tommy Bridges, Pete Browning, Charlie Buffinton, George H. Burns, George J. Burns, Dolph Camilli, Bob Caruthers, George Case, Phil Cavarretta, Spud Chandler, Ben Chapman, Cupid Childs, Harlond Clift, Jack Coombs, Mort Cooper, Walker Cooper, Wilbur Cooper, Tommy Corcoran, Doc Cramer, Gavvy Cravath, Lave Cross, Jake Daubert, Hooks Dauss, Paul Derringer, Dom DiMaggio, Bill Donovan, Patsy Donovan, Larry Doyle, Jimmy Dykes, Bob Elliott, Bob Ferguson, Freddie Fitzsimmons, Art Fletcher, Larry French, Jack Glasscock, Kid Gleason, George Gore, Heinie Groh, Stan Hack, Mel Harder, Jeff Heath, Tommy Henrich, Babe Herman, Paul Hines, Dummy Hoy, Sam Jethroe, Bob Johnson, Charley Jones, Sad Sam Jones, Joe Judge, Willie Kamm, Charlie Keller, Ken Keltner, Silver King, Johnny Kling, Ed Konetchy, Ray Kremer, Joe Kuhel, Arlie Latham, Tommy Leach, Sam Leever, Dutch Leonard, Herman Long, Bobby Lowe, Dolf Luque, Firpo Marberry, Pepper Martin, Bobby Mathews, Jim McCormick, Deacon McGuire, Stuffy McInnis, Ed McKean, Cal McVey, Bob Meusel, Irish Meusel, Clyde Milan, Bing Miller, Terry Moore, Wally Moses, George Mullin, Johnny Murphy, Buddy Myer, Art Nehf, Bobo Newsom, Al Orth, Roger Peckinpaugh, Johnny Pesky, Fred Pfeffer, Deacon Phillippe, Jack Powell, Del Pratt, Jack Quinn, Ed Reulbach, Hardy Richardson, Eddie Rommel, Charlie Root, Schoolboy Rowe, Nap Rucker, Jimmy Ryan, Johnny Sain, Slim Sallee, Wally Schang, Luke Sewell, Rip Sewell, Bob Shawkey, Jimmy Sheckard, Urban Shocker, Joe Start, Riggs Stephenson, Jack Stivetts, Ezra Sutton, Jesse Tannehill, Fred Tenney, Mike Tiernan, Hal Trosky, Dizzy Trout, Virgil Trucks, George Uhle, Johnny Vander Meer, George Van Haltren, Hippo Vaughn, Bobby Veach, Dixie Walker, Lon Warneke, Gus Weyhing, Doc White, Will White, Earl Whitehill, Jim Whitney, Cy Williams, Ken Williams, Smoky Joe Wood, Rudy York;

Managers: Charlie Grimm (on 2010 ballot), Steve O'Neill (on 2010 ballot), Chuck Dressen, Jimmy Dykes, Pat Moran, Jim Mutrie; 

Executives: Sam Breadon (on 2010, 2013 & 2016 ballots), August Herrmann (on 2016 ballot), Al Reach (on 2013 ballot), Chris von der Ahe (on 2016 ballot), Charles Ebbets, John Heydler, Harry Pulliam, Bob Quinn, Ben Shibe, Charles Somers, Charles Stoneham, John K. Tener, Nicholas Young; 

Umpires: Cy Rigler (on 2008 ballot), Bill Dinneen, Bob Emslie, John Gaffney, Tim Hurst, George Moriarty, Silk O'Loughlin, Brick Owens, Babe Pinelli, Ernie Quigley, Beans Reardon, Jack Sheridan, Bill Summers;

Pioneers: Doc Adams (on 2016 ballot w/ 10 votes), Ernest Lanigan, Tim Murnane.

Shoeless Joe Jackson has been ruled ineligible for future ballots due to accusations that he helped throw the 1919 World Series along with 7 other teammates, when they played for the Chicago White Sox. Even though they were ruled innocent of the charges in a court of law, Commissioner Kenesaw Mountain Landis ruled them permanently banned from baseball and placed them on the list of "permanently ineligible" individuals from playing, managing or otherwise participating in baseball. There is some disagreement as to the guilt of Jackson and Buck Weaver. Several individuals, including the late Hall of Famer Ted Williams, have since sought to remove Jackson's name from baseball's "Permanently Ineligible" List so he can appear on the Early Baseball Era Committee's ballot. The only way that will happen is if the Commissioner of Baseball removes his name from the "Permanently Ineligible" List.

Committee members

1953–2001

The following is a list of members of the Veterans Committee from its establishment in 1953 to its radical reformation in 2001, along with the dates of their membership.

J. G. Taylor Spink, publisher of The Sporting News from 1914 to 1962, Chairman of the committee (1953–1959)
Warren Brown, sportswriter who, among other things, is credited with giving Babe Ruth the nickname "The Sultan of Swat" (1953–1965)
Charlie Gehringer, Hall of Fame second baseman (1953–1992)
Warren Giles, President of the National League from 1951 to 1969; general manager of the Cincinnati Reds from 1937 to 1951 (1953–1978)
Frank Graham, sportswriter of the New York Journal-American. (1953–1965)
Will Harridge, President of the American League from 1931 to 1959 (1953–1971)
Paul Kerr, director of the Clark Foundation which funded the Hall, and future President of the Baseball Hall of Fame (1953–1978)
John Malaney sportswriter for The Boston Post and former BBWAA President (1953–1959)
Branch Rickey, who helped pioneer the farm system as general manager of the St. Louis Cardinals from 1919 to 1942, signed Jackie Robinson who broke the color barrier as president and general manager of the Brooklyn Dodgers from 1942 to 1950, and was at this time active general manager of the Pittsburgh Pirates, a position he held from 1950 to 1955 (1953–1965)
Charlie Segar, former sportswriter, and secretary-treasurer of the National League from 1951 to 1971 (1953–1993)
Frank Shaughnessy, President of the International League from 1936 to 1960 (1953–1969)
J. Roy Stockton, sportswriter for the St. Louis Post-Dispatch from 1918 to 1958, where he mostly covered the St. Louis Cardinals (1961–1971)
Dan Daniel, prolific sportswriter whose contributions over a long period led him to be called the dean of American baseball writers (1961–1976)
Joe Cronin, Hall of Fame shortstop [inducted in 1956] who also served as manager for the Boston Red Sox from 1935 to 1947, general manager for the Red Sox from 1947 to 1959, and President of the American League from 1959 to 1973 (1961–1984)
Ford Frick, National League President from 1934 to 1951 and Commissioner of Baseball from 1951 to 1965 (1966–1969)
Fred Lieb, sportswriter best known for nicknaming Yankee Stadium as "The House Ruth Built" (1966–1980)
Frankie Frisch, Hall of Fame second baseman [inducted 1947], who also served as manager (most notably for the St. Louis Cardinals from 1933 to 1938) and radio play-by-play announcer for Boston and the New York Giants (1967–1973)
Waite Hoyt, Hall of Fame pitcher [inducted 1969] who also served as radio play-by-play announcer for the Cincinnati Reds from 1942 to 1965 (1971–1976)
Bill Terry, Hall of Fame first baseman [inducted 1954], manager of the New York Giants from 1932 to 1941 (1971–1976)
Bob Broeg, sportswriter who covered the St. Louis Cardinals for 40 years, served on the Hall of Fame's Board of Directors from 1972 to 2000 (1972–2000)
Bill DeWitt, general manager of the St. Louis Browns from 1937 to 1951, and of the Cincinnati Reds from 1960 to 1966 (1973–1981)
Stan Musial, Hall of Fame outfielder and first baseman [inducted 1969] and general manager of the St. Louis Cardinals in 1967 (1973–2001)
Burleigh Grimes, Hall of Fame pitcher [inducted 1964] and longtime scout (1977–1985)
Edgar Munzel, sportswriter who wrote for the Chicago Herald-Examiner and Chicago Sun-Times from 1929 to 1973 (1977–1996)
Bob Addie, sportswriter who covered baseball for The Washington Post and Washington Times-Herald (1978–1981)
Joe Reichler, sportswriter for the Associated Press from 1943 to 1966 who mostly covered baseball teams in New York City (1978–1988)
Roy Campanella, Hall of Fame catcher [inducted 1969] (1978–1993)
Buzzie Bavasi, general manager for the Brooklyn/Los Angeles Dodgers [1950–1968], the San Diego Padres [1968–1972] and the California Angels [1977–1984] (1978–1999)
Al López, Hall of Fame manager [inducted 1977] for the Cleveland Indians [1951–1956] and Chicago White Sox [1957–1965, 1968–1969] (1978–1994)
Gabe Paul, general manager for the Cincinnati Reds [1951–1960], Cleveland Indians [1961–1969, 1971–1971] and New York Yankees [1974–1977], and President of the Cleveland Indians [1963–1971, 1978–1985] and New York Yankees [1973–1977] (1978–1993)
Joe L. Brown, general manager of the Pittsburgh Pirates from 1955 to 1976 (1979–2001)
Birdie Tebbetts, manager for the Cincinnati Reds [1954–1958], Milwaukee Braves [1961–1962] and Cleveland Indians [1964–1966] and longtime scout [1968–1997] (1979–1993)
Allen Lewis, sportswriter for The Philadelphia Inquirer from 1949 to 1979 (1979–2000)
Buck O'Neil, Negro league first baseman and manager, first African-American coach in Major League Baseball, longtime scout for the Chicago Cubs and Kansas City Royals and member of the Baseball Scouts Hall of Fame in St. Louis (1981–2001)
Milton Richman, sportswriter for the United Press International from 1944 until his death in 1986 (1983–1986)
Monte Irvin, Hall of Fame left fielder from the Negro leagues [1938–1942, 1948] and MLB New York Giants [1949–1955] and Chicago Cubs [1956] [inducted 1973]
Bob Fishel, executive for the St. Louis Browns [1946–1953] and New York Yankees [1954–1974], and American League executive vice president [1974–1988] (1985–1988)
Ted Williams, Hall of Fame left fielder (1986–2000)
Shirley Povich, sportswriter for The Washington Post from 1923 until his death in 1998 (1987–1993)
Red Barber, radio play-by-play announcer for the Cincinnati Reds [1934–1938], Brooklyn Dodgers [1939–1953] and New York Yankees [1954–1966] (1988–1990)
Ernie Harwell, play-by-play announcer, most notably for the Detroit Tigers [1960–1991, 1993–2002] (1988–1995; 2001)
Billy Herman, Hall of Fame second baseman [inducted 1975]
Jack Brickhouse, play-by-play announcer for the Chicago Cubs from 1948 to 1981 (1991–1993)
Yogi Berra, Hall of Fame catcher [inducted 1972]
Pee Wee Reese, Hall of Fame shortstop [inducted 1984] and television play-by-play announcer (1994–1999)
Bill White, sportscaster and National League president from 1989 to 1994 (1994–2001)
Ken Coleman, play-by-play announcer for the Cleveland Indians [1954–1963], Boston Red Sox [1965–1974, 1979–1989] and Cincinnati Reds [1975–1978] (1996–2003)
Leonard Koppett, sportswriter and author
Hank Peters, general manager of the Baltimore Orioles from 1975 to 1987 and GM of the Cleveland Indians from 1987 to 1992 (1996–2001)
Jerome Holtzman, sportswriter for the Chicago Sun-Times from 1943 to 1981 and the Chicago Tribune from 1981 to 1999, creator of the save statistic, and official historian of Major League Baseball from 1999 until his death in 2008 (1998–2001)
Hank Aaron, Hall of Fame right fielder [inducted 1982] and senior vice president for the Atlanta Braves since 1980 (2000–2021)
John McHale, general manager for the Milwaukee/Atlanta Braves [1959–1966] and Montreal Expos [1978–1984], president of the Montreal Expos [1969–1986] (2000–2007)

2008
As of December 2008, for 2009 Baseball Hall of Fame balloting, members of the Veterans Committee were:

Pre-1943 Veterans Committee members

Hall of Famers
Bobby Doerr
Ralph Kiner
Phil Niekro
Duke Snider
Don Sutton
Dick Williams

Historians
Furman Bisher
Roland Hemond
Steve Hirdt
Bill Madden
Claire Smith

Post-1942 Veterans Committee members (67)

Hank Aaron
Sparky Anderson
Luis Aparicio
Ernie Banks
Johnny Bench
Yogi Berra
Wade Boggs
George Brett
Lou Brock
Jim Bunning
Rod Carew
Steve Carlton
Gary Carter
Orlando Cepeda
Andre Dawson
Bobby Doerr
Dennis Eckersley

Bob Feller
Rollie Fingers
Carlton Fisk
Whitey Ford
Bob Gibson
Goose Gossage
Tony Gwynn
Rickey Henderson
Monte Irvin
Reggie Jackson
Ferguson Jenkins
Al Kaline
George Kell
Harmon Killebrew
Ralph Kiner
Sandy Koufax
Tommy Lasorda

Lee MacPhail
Juan Marichal
Willie Mays
Bill Mazeroski
Willie McCovey
Paul Molitor
Joe Morgan
Eddie Murray
Stan Musial
Phil Niekro
Jim Palmer
Tony Pérez
Gaylord Perry
Jim Rice
Cal Ripken Jr.
Brooks Robinson
Frank Robinson

Nolan Ryan
Ryne Sandberg
Mike Schmidt
Red Schoendienst
Tom Seaver
Ozzie Smith
Duke Snider
Bruce Sutter
Don Sutton
Earl Weaver
Billy Williams
Dick Williams
Dave Winfield
Carl Yastrzemski
Robin Yount

2010
As of November 2010, for 2011 Baseball Hall of Fame balloting, the only committee members announced were those voting for the post-1972 Expansion Era candidates:

Hall of Famers
Johnny Bench
Whitey Herzog
Eddie Murray
Jim Palmer
Tony Pérez
Frank Robinson
Ryne Sandberg
Ozzie Smith

Executives
Bill Giles
David Glass
Andy MacPhail
Jerry Reinsdorf

Media
Bob Elliott
Tim Kurkjian
Ross Newhan
Tom Verducci

2011
As of November 2011, for 2012 Baseball Hall of Fame balloting, the 16-member Golden Era Committee was announced:

Hall of Famers
Hank Aaron
Pat Gillick
Al Kaline
Ralph Kiner
Tommy Lasorda
Juan Marichal
Brooks Robinson
Billy Williams

Executives
Paul Beeston
Bill DeWitt
Roland Hemond
Gene Michael
Al Rosen

Media
Dick Kaegel
Jack O'Connell
Dave Van Dyck

2012

As of November 2012, for 2013 Baseball Hall of Fame balloting, the 16-member Pre-Integration Era Committee was announced:

 Executives: Bill DeWitt, Pat Gillick, Roland Hemond, Gary Hughes 
 Former players: Bert Blyleven, Phil Niekro, Don Sutton, Bob Watson
 Historians: Jim Henneman, Steve Hirdt, Tom Simon, Mark Whicker
 Media members: Peter Morris, Phil Pepe, Claire Smith, T. R. Sullivan

2013
The Pre-Integration Committee's 16-member voting electorate, appointed by the Hall of Fame's Board of Directors, was announced at the same time as the ballot of 10 candidates:
Hall of Famers: Bert Blyleven, Pat Gillick, Phil Niekro, Don Sutton
Executives: Bill DeWitt, Roland Hemond, Gary Hughes, Bob Watson
Media and historians: Jim Henneman, Steve Hirdt, Peter Morris, Phil Pepe, Tom Simon, Claire Smith, T.R. Sullivan, Mark Whicker

2014
The Expansion Era Committee's 16-member voting electorate, appointed by the Hall of Fame's Board of Directors, was announced at the same time as the ballot of 12 candidates. The Hall officially calls this group the "Expansion Era Committee", but media still generally refer to it as the "Veterans Committee".
 Hall of Famers: Rod Carew, Carlton Fisk, Whitey Herzog, Tommy Lasorda, Joe Morgan, Paul Molitor, Phil Niekro, Frank Robinson
 Executives: Paul Beeston, Andy MacPhail, Dave Montgomery, Jerry Reinsdorf
 Media and historians: Steve Hirdt, Bruce Jenkins, Jack O'Connor, Jim Reeves

2015
The Golden Era Committee's 16-member voting electorate, appointed by the Hall of Fame's Board of Directors, was announced at the same time as the ballot of 10 candidates. The Baseball Hall of Fame officially named this group the "Golden Era Committee" ("The Committee"), which voted for the first time on December 5, 2011. All of the Hall of Fame members on this committee were inducted as players, except for executive Pat Gillick.
 Hall of Famers: Jim Bunning, Rod Carew, Pat Gillick, Ferguson Jenkins, Al Kaline, Joe Morgan, Ozzie Smith, Don Sutton
 Executives: Jim Frey, David Glass, Roland Hemond, Bob Watson
 Media: Steve Hirdt, Dick Kaegel, Phil Pepe, Tracy Ringolsby

2016
The Pre-Integration ballot for election was released on October 5, 2015; final voting was conducted by the Pre-Integration Committee, a 16-member body which met at baseball's winter meetings in Nashville on December 6, with 75% (12 of 16 votes) required for election; results were announced the following morning. The committee's members, appointed by the Hall of Fame's board of directors, were announced later in fall 2015 and included members of the Hall, baseball executives, members of the media and historians:

Hall of Famers: Bert Blyleven, Bobby Cox, Pat Gillick and Phil Niekro
Executives: Chuck Armstrong, Bill DeWitt, Gary Hughes and Tal Smith
Media/Historians: Steve Hirdt, Peter Morris, Jack O'Connell, Claire Smith, Tim Sullivan, T.R. Sullivan, Gary Thorne and Tim Wendel

Blyleven, Gillick, Niekro, DeWitt, Hughes, Hirdt, Morris, Smith and T.R. Sullivan previously served on the committee which selected the 2013 inductees. For the second consecutive year, none of the candidates received enough votes for election; it marked the third consecutive year – and the fifth time in seven years – in which no former players were chosen by the Hall's special committees. Speaking on MLB Network's Hot Stove immediately after it broadcast the announcement, Major League Baseball's official historian John Thorn expressed surprise and disappointment at the results, noting that he had felt there were three particularly strong candidates (prior to the announcement, he had commented favorably on the candidacies of Doc Adams and Harry Stovey); he speculated that the number of good candidates may have deadlocked the voting once again, and suggested that the Hall may need to amend the voting process in the future.

2017

The committee consisted of the following individuals:
 Hall of Famers: Roberto Alomar, Bobby Cox, Andre Dawson, Dennis Eckersley, Pat Gillick, Ozzie Smith, Don Sutton and Frank Thomas
 Executives: Paul Beeston, Bill DeWitt, David Glass, Andy MacPhail and Kevin Towers
 Media and historians: Bill Center, Steve Hirdt, and Tim Kurkjian
 Non-voting committee chair: Jane Forbes Clark (Hall of Fame chairman)

2018
The committee consisted of the following individuals:
 Hall of Famers: George Brett, Rod Carew, Bobby Cox, Dennis Eckersley, John Schuerholz, Don Sutton, Dave Winfield, Robin Yount
 Executives: Sandy Alderson, Paul Beeston, Bob Castellini, David Glass, Bill DeWitt
 Media and historians: Bob Elliott, Steve Hirdt, Jayson Stark
 Non-voting committee chair: Jane Forbes Clark (Hall of Fame chairman)

2019
The committee consisted of the following individuals:
 Hall of Famers: Roberto Alomar, Bert Blyleven, Pat Gillick, Tony La Russa, Greg Maddux, Joe Morgan, John Schuerholz, Ozzie Smith, Joe Torre
 Executives: Al Avila, Paul Beeston, Andy MacPhail, Jerry Reinsdorf
 Media and historians: Steve Hirdt, Tim Kurkjian, Claire Smith
 Non-voting committee chair: Jane Forbes Clark (Hall of Fame chairman)

2020
The cutoff for election to the Hall of Fame remained the standard 75%; as the Modern Baseball Era Committee consisted of 16 members, 12 votes was the minimum for selection. The 16-member Hall of Fame Board-appointed electorate charged with the review of the Modern Baseball Era featured Hall of Fame members George Brett, Rod Carew, Dennis Eckersley, Eddie Murray, Ozzie Smith and Robin Yount; major league executives Sandy Alderson, Dave Dombrowski, David Glass, Walt Jocketty, Doug Melvin and Terry Ryan; and veteran media members/historians Bill Center, Steve Hirdt, Jack O’Connell and Tracy Ringolsby.

2021
Due to the COVID-19 pandemic, meetings of the Early Baseball committee and Golden Days committee were postponed from December 2020 to December 2021.

2022
Early Baseball Committee

The committee consisted of the following individuals:
 Hall of Famers: Bert Blyleven, Ferguson Jenkins, John Schuerholtz, Ozzie Smith, Joe Torre
 Executives: William DeWitt Jr., Ken Kendrick, Tony Reagins
 Media and historians: Steve Hirdt, Rick Hummel, John Thorn, Gary Ashwill, Adrian Burgos Jr., Leslie Heaphy, Jim Henneman, Justice B. Hill
 Non-voting committee chair: Bud Selig, Jane Forbes Clark (Hall of Fame chairman)

Golden Days Era Committee

The committee consisted of the following individuals:
 Hall of Famers: Rod Carew, Ferguson Jenkins, Mike Schmidt, John Schuerholtz, Bud Selig, Ozzie Smith, Joe Torre
 Executives: Al Avila, William DeWitt Jr., Ken Kendrick, Kim Ng, Tony Reagins
 Media and historians: Steve Hirdt, Jaime Jarrin, Adrian Burgos Jr., Jack O'Connell
 Non-voting committee chair: Jane Forbes Clark (Hall of Fame chairman)

2023
Contemporary Era Baseball Committee

The committee consisted of the following individuals:
 Hall of Famers: Greg Maddux, Jack Morris, Ryne Sandberg, Lee Smith, Frank Thomas, Alan Trammell
 Executives: Paul Beeston, Theo Epstein, Derrick Hall, Arte Moreno, Kim Ng, Dave St. Peter, Ken Williams
 Media and historians: Steve Hirdt, La Velle Neal, Susan Slusser

See also
 List of members of the Baseball Hall of Fame

Notes

References

External links
Baseball Hall of Fame: The Veterans Committee

National Baseball Hall of Fame and Museum
Awards juries and committees